Alamein International University (AIU) is an Egyptian national, non-profit university which was inaugurated in 2020 in accordance with a presidential decree Number 435 of 2020 issued by President Abdel Fattah El-Sisi  located in New Alamein City, Matrouh Governorate in Egypt.

Campus
Alamein International University - AIU is built on approximately 150 acres and includes a central library, Outdoor theater, sports & entertainment area, university hospital, dentistry hospital, university administration building, 10 buildings for faculties, 4 Accommodation towers for students and Staff, as well as extra 9 residential buildings outside the university campus in Eleskan Elmotamyez district.

Faculties
Alamein International University (AIU) has 15 faculties with more than 44 academic programs in 13 different fields:

•Faculties:
 Faculty of Administrative & Business Sciences. <Started October 2020>
 Faculty of International Legal Studies. <Started October 2020>
 Faculty of Arts & Design. <Started October 2020>
 Faculty of Engineering Sciences. <Started October 2020>
 Faculty of Computer Science & Engineering. <Started October 2020>
 Faculty of Pharmacy. <Started October 2020>
 Faculty of Dentistry. <Started October 2021>
 Faculty of Sciences. <Started October 2021>
 Faculty of Advanced Basic Sciences. <Started October 2022>
 Faculty of Mass Media & Communication. <Will be Available Later>
 Faculty of Social & Human Sciences. <Will be Available Later>
 Faculty of Faculty of Tourism & Hospitality. <Will be Available Later>
 Faculty of Medicine. <Will be Available Later>
 Faculty of Nursing. <Will be Available Later>
 Faculty of Graduate Studies. <Will be Available Later>

References

Universities in Egypt
Educational institutions established in 2020
2020 establishments in Egypt
Public universities
Matrouh Governorate